R93 may refer to:
 Blaser R93, a German rifle
 Blaser R93 Tactical, a sniper rifle
 , a destroyer of the Royal Navy